Ketevan "Keti" Chkhikvadze is a  Georgian fashion designer.

Keti is also a well-known fashion designer in Kazakhstan.

Keti's brand is presented in Tbilisi, Paris, UAE, Italy, Kyiv, Moscow, Saint Petersburg and Kazakhstan.

References

Businesspeople from Tbilisi
Living people
Fashion designers from Georgia (country)
Year of birth missing (living people)